Vange is the solo debut album by Brazilian musician and former Nau member Vange Leonel. It was released in 1991 by Sony Music Entertainment, and produced by Nando Reis (Vange's cousin) and Charles Gavin. Both were members of popular rock band Titãs at the time.

The album spawned the hit single "Noite Preta"; it was used as the opening theme of the popular telenovela Vamp, that premiered also in 1991 and ran until 1992. A music video was shot for the track, directed by Cilmara Bedaque (Vange's songwriting partner since the times of her former band Nau) and Luiz Ferré. "Esse Mundo" would be used as the opening theme for another telenovela a year later, Perigosas Peruas, that ran from February to August 1992.

"Divino, Maravilhoso" is a cover of the famous Gal Costa song, originally performed by her on her self-titled 1969 debut album. It was written and composed by Caetano Veloso and Gilberto Gil.

Track listing

 "Felizes" was not included on the vinyl issue of the album.

Personnel
 Vange Leonel – vocals, rhythm guitar
 Nando Reis – guitar, bass guitar, production
 Charles Gavin – drums, production

References

1991 debut albums
Vange Leonel albums
Portuguese-language albums